Little Leighs is a village and former civil parish, now in the parish of Great and Little Leighs, in the Chelmsford district in the English county of Essex. In 1931 the parish had a population of 158. On 1 April 1949 the parish was abolished and merged with Great Leighs to form "Great and Little Leighs".

Little Leighs lies beside the River Ter, just south of the village of Great Leighs. Until rerouting bypassed the village, Little Leighs was on the A131 road.

The church in the village is dedicated to St John the Evangelist. Built of flint rubble, the fabric of the structure dates back at least as far as the early twelfth century.

References

External links

 Great and Little Leighs Parish Council
 Churches at the Leighs and Lt. Waltham
 The War Memorials at the Churches of Gt. & Lt. Leighs and Lt. Waltham

Villages in Essex
Former civil parishes in Essex